Kateryna Denysenko (born 7 March 1994) is a Ukrainian Paralympic swimmer. She represented the Ukraine at the 2020 Summer Paralympics.

Career
Denysenko represented Ukraine in the women's 100 metre backstroke event at the 2020 Summer Paralympics and won a silver medal.

Personal life
Her husband, Iaroslav, is also a Paralympic swimmer for Ukraine.

References

1994 births
Living people
Sportspeople from Kyiv
Ukrainian female backstroke swimmers
Medalists at the World Para Swimming Championships
Medalists at the World Para Swimming European Championships
Paralympic swimmers of Ukraine
Paralympic medalists in swimming
Paralympic silver medalists for Ukraine
Swimmers at the 2020 Summer Paralympics
Medalists at the 2020 Summer Paralympics
Ukrainian female butterfly swimmers
Ukrainian female freestyle swimmers
S8-classified Paralympic swimmers
21st-century Ukrainian women